Honglian Nanlu station is a station on Line 16 of the Beijing Subway. The station opened on 31 December 2022.

Station Layout 
The station has an underground island platform. There are 4 exits, lettered A, B, C and D. Exit B is accessible via an elevator.

References 

Beijing Subway stations in Xicheng District